The following is a list of events relating to television in Ireland from 2020.

The Late Late Toy Show broadcast on 27 November was the most watched programme on Irish television in 2020.

Events
2 January – The death of broadcaster Marian Finucane, who presented Crimecall in the 1990s, is announced.
7 January – The death of broadcaster Larry Gogan, best known as a 2fm disc-jockey, who provided the RTÉ television commentary at the 1978, 1980, 1981 and 1982 Eurovision Song Contests, is announced.
24 January – ITV Box Office, a pay-per-view television service from ITV, and the only ITV service available in Ireland via Sky, ceases broadcasting.
17 March – Taoiseach Leo Varadkar makes a special broadcast to the nation called A Ministerial Broadcast by An Taoiseach Leo Varadkar, TD, in which he says the COVID-19 emergency could go on for months into the summer.
16 May – RTÉ One airs Eurovision: Europe Shine A Light to mark the cancelled 2020 Eurovision Song Contest. The programme, broadcast by all countries participating in the competition, showcases the forty one acts that would have appeared in Eurovision 2020.
26 June – RTÉ Does Comic Relief is held. The event was broadcast live on RTÉ One and the RTÉ Player for over 4 hours with over 5 million raised for charities.

Debuts
7 January - The Style Counsellors
22 March - Keys To My Life
31 March – Miss Scarlet and The Duke
18 May – Dead Still

Ongoing television programmes

1960s
 RTÉ News: Nine O'Clock (1961–present)
 RTÉ News: Six One (1962–present)
 The Late Late Show (1962–present)

1970s
 The Late Late Toy Show (1975–present)
 The Sunday Game (1979–present)

1980s
 Fair City (1989–present)
 RTÉ News: One O'Clock (1989–present)

1990s
 Would You Believe (1990s–present)
 Winning Streak (1990–present)
 Prime Time (1992–present)
 Nuacht RTÉ (1995–present)
 Nuacht TG4 (1996–present)
 Ros na Rún (1996–present)
 TV3 News (1998–present)
 Ireland AM (1999–present)
 Telly Bingo (1999–present)

2000s
 Nationwide (2000–present)
 TV3 News at 5.30 (2001–present) – now known as the 5.30
 Against the Head (2003–present)
 news2day (2003–present)
 Other Voices (2003–present)
 Saturday Night with Miriam (2005–present)
 The Week in Politics (2006–present)
 At Your Service (2008–present)
 Operation Transformation (2008–present)
 3e News (2009–present)
 Dragons' Den (2009–present)
 Two Tube (2009–present)

2010s
 Jack Taylor (2010–present)
 Mrs. Brown's Boys (2011–present)
 MasterChef Ireland (2011–present)
 Today (2012–present)
 The Works (2012–present)
 Celebrity MasterChef Ireland (2013–present)
 Second Captains Live (2013–present)
 Claire Byrne Live (2015–present)
 The Restaurant (2015–present)
 Red Rock (2015–present)
 TV3 News at 8 (2015–present)
 First Dates (2016–present)
 Dancing with the Stars (2017–present)
 The Tommy Tiernan Show (2017–present)
 Striking Out (2017–present)

Deaths
2 January – Marian Finucane, radio and tv presenter, who presented Crimecall'' in the 1990s.
7 January – Larry Gogan, disc jockey and TV compere, best known as a 2fm disc-jockey, who provided the RTÉ television commentary at the 1978, 1980, 1981 and 1982 Eurovision Song Contest.

See also
2020 in Ireland

References